The St. Bonaventure Bonnies football program, commonly known as the Brown and White until 1931 and thereafter as the Brown Indians throughout the rest of the team's existence, was the intercollegiate American football team for St. Bonaventure University located in St. Bonaventure, New York. The team competed in independent. The school's first football team was fielded in 1895. St. Bonaventure participated in football from 1895 to 1951, compiling an all-time record of 161–157–26. The football program was discontinued at the conclusion of the 1951 season. 

A second St. Bonaventure football team played three seasons from 1968 to 1970; this squad played only at the club team level and not as a varsity squad. St. Bonaventure changed its athletics moniker from "Brown Indians" to "Bonnies" in 1992, several decades after the football team played its last game.

History

Notable former players
Notable alumni include:
Jack Butler: Hall of Fame cornerback for the Pittsburgh Steelers, 1951–59
Ted Marchibroda: Later NFL coach for the Indianapolis Colts (1992–95) and Baltimore Ravens (1996-98)

Year-by-year results

Championships

Conference championships 

Conference affiliations:
1895–1925, independent
1926–49, Western New York Little Three Conference
1950–51, independent

See also
 St. Bonaventure Bonnies, For information on all St. Bonaventure University sports

References

 
American football teams established in 1895
Sports clubs disestablished in 1970
1895 establishments in New York (state)